Cheburashka, also known as Chebi: My Fluffy Friend is a 2023 Russian live-action/computer-animated children's comedy film directed by Dmitry Dyachenko. The film is an adaptation of the 1960s Eduard Uspensky's children's book Gena the Crocodile and His Friends, and its Soviet cartoon adaptation about adventures of Gena the Crocodile and Cheburashka. The film stars Olga Kuzmina as the titular character along with Sergei Garmash, Fyodor Dobronravov, and Elena Yakovleva. The idea for the film was put into motion as early as 2020, but filming began in early 2021 at the Sochi Arboretum.

Cheburashka was theatrically released in Russia on January 1, 2023, by Central Partnership.

Cheburashka set a box office record among Russian films released on January 1: it grossed more than 225 million rubles on the first day of release, and 837 million rubles in the first three days. After fifteen days of release, the film had already collected over 4 billion rubles, making it the highest-grossing Russian film. It also became the first film to gross more than ₽5 billion.

Cheburashka received generally mixed to positive reviews from critics and audiences. Critics highly praised its visual effects, though the story was considered to be predictable. Following the film's success, Soyuzmultfilm signed a deal to produce a sequel and the whole franchise.

Plot 
It starts with showing an orange grove in Spain, where several farmers are picking oranges, until a furry animal with big ears appears there, who loves to eat oranges and steals them. One day people get tired of enduring it and decide to catch him. With the help of a trap with bait in the form of oranges, they manage to catch the animal. However, a huge hurricane suddenly appears and drags away all the oranges along with the animal itself, and people manage to escape.

At this time, on the Black Sea Coast of Russia, the withdrawn old man Gena, who works as a gardener in an arboretum, is trying to restore his relationship with his daughter Tanya.

Tanya, together with her husband Tolya and son Grisha, live in a mini-shop where they sell the most delicious chocolate and prepare for the annual festival. In addition, Gena's life gets even worse when he is rude and insults Rimma, the headmistress of the chocolate factory, for which he is almost fired. When oranges begin to fall everywhere over the city after a hurricane, the animal itself enters this area with them. Entering Gena's house, he, mistaking the orange helmet for a large orange, tries to take it off and smashes everything in the house, after which he falls into the hands of Gena. At first, Gena resists the animal and tries in every possible way to get rid of it, but over time he begins to get used to him and decides to keep him, calling him “Belarusian Shepherd Dog” in front of many people.

One day, when Gena came to visit Tanya on the birthday of her silent son Grisha to congratulate his grandson and ask his daughter for forgiveness for the past, the animal itself also gets there. Grisha is surprised by this kind of animal and begins to talk for the first time. Thanks to Grisha, the animal also learns to speak Russian, and after that Gena begins to teach him to read various books, and Grisha, thanks to that very animal, wants to visit Grandpa Gena sometimes. Tanya starts talking to her father again.
At this time, Larion steals a cookbook from Tanya, according to which she and her husband cooked and sold chocolate. Upon learning of the theft, Tanya and her husband Tolya plan to refuse to take part in the sweets festival. Gena and her friend Valera come to Rimma's house and demand that the book be returned. Rimma agrees to return her on the condition that Gena give her and her granddaughter Sonya his eared, which before that had been very fond of capricious Sonya.

Gena has no other choice but to give the animal in exchange for a book. At the same time, along the way, he recalls his youth, when he also had to temporarily give Tanya away when she was still young. Gena manages to exchange the recipe book for the animal and return the book back to his daughter. However, she begins to hate her father even more when she finds out that he gave that same animal in exchange for her. Gena cannot forgive himself for what he has done for a long time and decides to get the animal out of Rimma's lair.
To do this, he asks for help from his true friends, Valera, Galya is an ice cream saleswoman, the boss is a woman, and the janitor is a man. Together with them, they make their way to Rimma's house, but find that the animal is not there, because she, along with Sonya, took it with them to the festival, where Rimma plans to launch a rocket into the sky, which will explode in the air and, instead of a salute, will scatter candies to all people.

At night, when the animal is left in one of the tents, Gena sneaks in and apologizes to the eared for what he had to do, after which he talks about what he had to endure for a long time, his wife Lyuba.
The animal forgives Gena, and they decide to leave the fair. However, Grisha turns out to be inside the candy rocket that is about to take off into the sky. The animal dares to run to the boy to help and before the rocket explodes, jumps down with him, gliding on pseudo-ears, where people manage to pick them up.

The next day, all Gena's friends and relatives, as well as Tanya, Tolya and Grisha, celebrate the animal's birthday, as they don't know exactly when it was born. The animal itself at this moment calls itself by the name that he himself came up with - Cheburashka, since he periodically fell and uttered the word "cheburahnul" aloud throughout the film. Rimma herself comes to Cheburashka's birthday, who apologizes to Gena and his whole family for the incident with the rocket and repents, besides, after this incident, she was deprived of her maternal rights and Sonya was taken away from her. Gena forgives Rimma and invites her to sit down at the table, after which she begins to sing the song "Unfortunately, the birthday is only once a year" on the harmonica.

In the scene after the credits, a joke is played out when Gena and Cheburashka are riding a motorcycle along the highway, and a policeman stops them and says:  “Take this off the wheel”. To this, the indignant Cheburashka replies: “I am ...!”.

Cast

Voice cast 
  as Cheburashka, voice acting
Cheburashka is an big-eared animal that lives in an orange grove and ends up in a small town by the sea, where he meets an old man who is closed in himself, a boy who cannot speak, his mother and an unusual lady who wants to buy it and give it to her granddaughter, as well as a huge number of other characters.

Live-action cast 
 Sergei Garmash as Gena, a gardener (the prototype is Gena the Crocodile)
 Artyom Bystrov as Young Gena
 Fyodor Dobronravov as Valery "Valera" Zavgorodny, exotic animal specialist
 Elena Yakovleva as Rimma, director of the chocolate factory (the prototype is Old Lady Shapoklyak)
  as Larion, Rimma's assistant (the prototype is Shapoklyak's pet rat Lariska)
 Eva Smirnova as Sonya, a little girl, Rimma's granddaughter
 Ilya Kondratenko as Grisha, mute boy
 Polina Maksimova as Tanya, Gena's daughter and Grisha's mother
 Alisa Mynay as Tanya as a child
 Sergei Lavygin as Tolya, Grisha's father
 Sophia Zayka as Galya, an ice cream and drinks vendor
 Natalya Shchukina as Natalya (English: Natalia), director of the arboretum, Gena's boss
 Zhannat Kerimbaev as a street cleaner
 Olivier Siou as Rimma's cook
 Konstantin Fadeev as Vasily, Rimma's driver
 Marina Konyashkina as Lyuba, Gena's wife

Production 
Dmitry Dyachenko about a furry animal named Cheburashka, who gets into a new world.
Yuliana Slashcheva is the chairman of the board of the Soyuzmultfilm film studio, and Eduard Iloyan is the general producer of Yellow, Black and White studio. They were engaged in the creation of the cartoon in tandem with the STS and Russia-1 channels. The start of filming was scheduled for 2021. The film adaptation will be shared by both channels, but the premiere launch is expected on Russia-1. YBW is responsible for financing the project, according to preliminary data, production costs were to amount to at least 600 million rubles.

Post-production 

The film is planned to contain a large amount of computer graphics. Cheburashka will be created using motion capture technology and other modern devices. It will be integrated into the film using the Full CG blending method.

Filming 
Principal photography of the film started in September 2021 in Sochi, Krasnodar Krai, using the Sochi Arboretum park, on the sea embankment and the Sanatorium named after G.K. Ordzhonikidze were used as locations.

A little later, the team will move to the cities of Pyatigorsk, Kislovodsk and Yessentuki, Stavropol Krai, and then go to Moscow for field recordings. The creators specifically chose such places to create a sense of timelessness.

Soundtrack
The soundtrack for this film is the song "Balloon", which was performed by the Russian band "My Michelle", the songwriter is Tatyana Tkachuk. The song was released on digital platforms on January 1, 2023.

Release 
Cheburashka premiered on December 23, 2022 at the Karo October 11 cinema center in Moscow on New Arbat Avenue, and the wide release in the Russian Federation was for January 1, 2023 with the help of Central Partnership.

Reception

Box office
The film paid back its initial budget of 850 million rubles in three days, subsequently becoming the highest-grossing film in the Russian box office in its entire history. On January 5, film screenings were attended by 1.2 million viewers, and the fees for that day amounted to 396.5 million rubles. As of January 6, 2023, the film's box office receipts amounted to more than 2 billion rubles, this is already the sixth film of domestic production that has overcome this threshold.
In the Russian box office, only 13 films have passed the two billion mark, including such films as Avatar, The Lion King (2019) and others.

On January 10, 2023, Cheburashka became the highest-grossing Russian film in the history of domestic distribution, having collected more than 3.09 billion rubles. On January 13, 2023, Cheburashka became the highest-grossing film in the history of Russian film distribution, outperforming James Cameron's Avatar. On January 15, 2023, the amount of fees exceeded 4 billion rubles. During the month of January, the film was watched by over 20 million Russians, and the fees exceeded 6 billion rubles.

References

External links 
 

2023 films
2020s children's comedy films
2023 computer-animated films
2020s Russian-language films
Russian animated films
Animated comedy films
Russian children's comedy films
Films with live action and animation
Films based on Russian novels
Films based on children's books
Black Sea in fiction
Films shot in Sochi
Films shot in the North Caucasus
Films shot in Moscow
Russian nonlinear narrative films
Films using motion capture
Films about father–daughter relationships
Films about deaf people